WGBX-TV (channel 44), branded on-air as GBH 44 since 2020, is the secondary PBS member television station in Boston, Massachusetts, United States. Owned by the WGBH Educational Foundation, it is sister to Boston's primary PBS member station and company flagship WGBH-TV (channel 2), Springfield, Massachusetts-based PBS member WGBY-TV (channel 57, operated by New England Public Media), Class A Biz TV affiliate WFXZ-CD (channel 24) and public radio stations WGBH (89.7 FM) and WCRB (99.5 FM) in the Boston area, and WCAI radio (and satellites WZAI and WNAN) on Cape Cod. WGBX-TV, WGBH-TV and the WGBH and WCRB radio stations share studios on Guest Street in northwest Boston's Brighton neighborhood; WGBX-TV's transmitter is located on Cedar Street (southwest of I-95/MA 128) in Needham, Massachusetts, which is shared with WBZ-TV, WCVB-TV, WBTS-CD (which itself shares spectrum with WGBX) and WSBK-TV.

The X in WGBX's callsign stands for "experimental", as WGBX (more primarily in the 1970s) was home to programming that was given a trial run on the lower-rated UHF signal before possibly moving onto the more-established WGBH-TV. Such Eastern Educational Network imports from the United Kingdom as Doctor Who were seen first or more frequently on WGBX, and one late 1970s local "nightclub"-style variety show, Club 44, proved popular enough to be moved over to WGBH and retitled The Club. The station airs PBS programs that are not aired by WGBH-TV as well as additional supplemental programming. Reruns of the previous night's programming either from WGBH-TV or from WGBX-TV itself also makes up part of channel 44's programming schedule.

WGBX also carries most of the national digital subchannel networks (except for World Channel) which are managed by the WGBH Educational Foundation (along with an additional station, as described below); this enables WGBH to maintain a high-bitrate 1080i high definition picture resolution on its main channel 2 signal, with little loss in visual quality.

History 

On December 11, 1963, the WGBH Educational Foundation applied for a construction permit to build a second station on channel 44; WGBX was approved on October 21, 1964. The station began broadcasting on September 25, 1967, and initially carried almost exclusively specialist programming, gradually turning into a second channel of educational and public programs. Since launching, its transmitter has been located in Needham (on a broadcast tower that is owned by CBS Corporation, and is used by some of the Boston market's commercial television stations, including CBS-owned WBZ-TV), WGBX's current digital transmitter shares the master antenna at the very top of the tower with the commercial stations. The now-defunct analog signal maintained a separate antenna on a lower portion of the tower that was shared with WGBH's digital transmitter.

WGBX shut down its analog signal, over UHF channel 44, on April 23, 2009. The station's digital signal continued to be broadcast on its pre-transition UHF channel 43. Through the use of PSIP digital television receivers display the station's virtual channel as its former UHF analog channel 44.

World Channel moved from digital subchannel 44.2 to 2.2 in the spring of 2012, replacing WGBH's standard definition simulcast.

On January 16, 2017, WGBX switched its DT4 subchannel from a locally programmed loop of children's programming (which looped twice a day) to the relaunched national PBS Kids channel.

On January 18, 2018, WGBX began a channel share with Nashua, New Hampshire-licensed WYCN-CD (channel 15, now WBTS-CD), which was acquired by the NBC Owned Television Stations subsidiary of NBCUniversal. Despite WBTS-CD's low-power status, WGBX's transmitter acts as a full-market relay of WBTS-CD, an NBC O&O station, along with its Cozi TV subchannel; WGBX's multiplexer was then upgraded to handle WGBX's existing HD channel and two SD channels, along with WBTS-CD's HD channel and one subchannel as a result of the channel share.

In 2019, with WGBH moving to VHF 5, both station's channel maps were adapted, with WGBH handling both the 2.1 and 44.1 HD signals, and WGBX mainly carrying standard definition subchannels in order to provide appropriate bandwidth to WYCN-CD, which itself had its calls changed to WBTS-CD in the same period of time. This is equivalent to the channel distribution plan used by Twin Cities PBS in Minneapolis–Saint Paul, which divides its subchannels among two existing stations (though all channels map to channel 2 rather than the second station's channel 17).

Technical information

Subchannels 

The station's digital signal is multiplexed. Note that WGBX-DT1 actually transmits as WGBH's second subchannel to provide a full-quality high definition signal for that station:

See also 
 Channel 32 digital TV stations in the United States
 Channel 44 virtual TV stations in the United States
 List of television stations in Massachusetts
 List of United States stations available in Canada

References

External links 

PBS member stations
Television channels and stations established in 1967
1967 establishments in Massachusetts
GBX-TV
WGBH Educational Foundation